Joseph Dutton (April 27, 1843 – March 26, 1931) was a Civil War veteran and Union Army lieutenant, who converted to Catholicism and later worked as a missionary with Father Damien.

Biography
He was born Ira Barnes Dutton in Stowe, Vermont, son of Ezra Dutton and Abigail Barnes.

Dutton carried out his studies at Old Academy and Milton Academy, Wisconsin and in 1861 enlisted in 13th Wisconsin Infantry under Colonel Maurice Malooney. He was a quartermaster in the 13th Wisconsin Volunteer Infantry Regiment during the American Civil War. He had been raised Protestant in Baptist Sunday schools and was for a time married. The marriage did not last as his wife (who he never mentioned by name) was unfaithful and Dutton developed problems with alcohol. He quit drinking in 1876 and later took the name Joseph.

He converted to Roman Catholicism in 1883 and afterward spent 20 months at the Abbey of Our Lady of Gethsemani. In 1886 Dutton went to Molokai to aid the dying Father Damien, who was grateful for his assistance. Dutton remembered that he told Father Damien "My name is Joseph Dutton; I’ve come to help, and I’ve come to stay" upon meeting him—and he did stay, for the remainder of his life. After Father Damien's death Dutton founded the Baldwin Home for men and boys with financial assistance from Henry Perrine Baldwin.

Dutton was a member of the Secular Franciscan Order. He was often called "Brother Joseph."

Dutton wrote the article "Molokai" for the Catholic Encyclopedia, and composed and sent many letters detailing life on the island, and U. S. President Theodore Roosevelt was one of those who read of his service to the ailing. He was so impressed by the veteran's work that he ordered the United States Navy's Great White Fleet to pay tribute to him by dipping their flags as they passed by the island.

Dutton died in Honolulu on March 26, 1931. He was buried at St. Philomena Catholic Church Cemetery, Kalaupapa. In 2015, the Diocese of Honolulu set up a committee to evaluate the possibility of canonization. In December 2015, the Joseph Dutton Guild was established by the Diocese of Honolulu to petition the Diocese of Honolulu to start the formal cause of beatification and canonization.  At the present, the  Guild is in the process of collecting evidence to ascertain whether a petition for a formal cause is feasible.

References

Further reading
 Crouch, Howard E. Brother Dutton of Molokai. Bellmore, N.Y: Damien-Dutton Society for Leprosy Aid, 2000.
 Dutton, Charles J. The Samaritans of Molokai: The Lives of Father Damien and Brother Dutton Among the Lepers. Freeport, N.Y: Books for Libraries Press, 1971.
 Dutton, Joseph. Joseph Dutton, His Memoirs: The Story of Forty-Four Years of Service Among the Lepers of Molokai, Hawaii. Honolulu: Honolulu Star-Bulletin, 1931.

External links

Brother Joseph Dutton at Kalaupapaa National Historic Park
A Servant of the Lepers: Brother Joseph of Molokai
Ira B. Dutton at Wisconsin Veterans Museum
Carte de viste images of Ira B. Dutton from the Wisconsin Historical Society:  
Joseph Dutton papers at Notre Dame

1843 births
1931 deaths
Roman Catholic missionaries in Hawaii
American Roman Catholic missionaries
Converts to Roman Catholicism from Baptist denominations
Milton College alumni
Members of the Third Order of Saint Francis
Union Army officers
People from Stowe, Vermont
People from Janesville, Wisconsin
People of Wisconsin in the American Civil War
People from Molokai
20th-century venerated Christians
American Servants of God
People from Kalawao County, Hawaii
Catholics from Wisconsin
Catholics from Hawaii
Catholics from Vermont
Contributors to the Catholic Encyclopedia